Raja Simham is a 1995 Telugu-language action comedy film directed by K. Raghavendra Rao and produced by Ch.V. Appa Rao. The film stars Rajasekhar, Ramya Krishna and Soundarya. The music was composed by Raj–Koti. It was released on 9 March 1995.

Cast 
Rajasekhar as Major Raj Kumar / Chinna Raja & Shrimannarayana (Dual role)
Ramya Krishna as Lata
Soundarya as Sundari
Ranganath
Kaikala Satyanarayana as Kukka Raja
Kota Srinivasa Rao as Pilli Raja
Sharat Saxena as Ali Khan
Srihari
Brahmanandam as Ashirvadam
Mallikarjuna Rao as bank manager
Sudhakar
Ali
Suthivelu
Shubha as Shrimannarayana's mother
Vijaya Lalitha
Sangeeta
Sudha
Jayalalita

Soundtrack

References

External links

1995 films
Films directed by K. Raghavendra Rao
Indian action comedy films
1995 action comedy films
1990s Telugu-language films
Films scored by Raj–Koti